Kerm may refer to:
 Farsi word for worm

See also
 KERM, a radio station